The 2007 Soul Train Music Awards were held on March 10, 2007 at the Pasadena Civic Auditorium in Pasadena, California and it was hosted by LeToya Luckett and Omarion. The awards ceremony was televised on March 17 and 24 on cable TV.

The ceremony included a performance by Jennifer Hudson, Hudson also received the Entertainer of the Year award. Other performers included, were Robin Thicke, LeToya Luckett, Rick Ross and Ronald Isley, also a special tribute to the God Father of Soul, James Brown.

Special awards

Quincy Jones Award for Outstanding Career Achievements
 Jermaine Dupri

Stevie Wonder Award for Outstanding Achievement in Songwriting
 Babyface

Sammy Davis, Jr. Award for "Entertainer of the Year"
 Jennifer Hudson

Winners and nominees
Winners are in bold text.

Best R&B/Soul Album – Male
 Jamie Foxx – Unpredictable
 Chris Brown – Chris Brown
 John Legend – Once Again
 Robin Thicke – The Evolution of Robin Thicke

Best R&B/Soul Album – Female
 Mary J. Blige – The Breakthrough
 Beyoncé – B'Day
 India.Arie – Testimony: Vol. 1, Life & Relationship
 Monica – The Makings of Me

Best R&B/Soul Album – Group, Band or Duo
 The Isley Brothers Featuring Ronald Isley – Baby Makin' Music
 Gnarls Barkley – St. Elsewhere
 Danity Kane – Danity Kane
 Jagged Edge – Jagged Edge

Best R&B/Soul Single – Male
 John Legend – "Save Room"
 Avant – "4 Minutes"
 Chris Brown – "Yo (Excuse Me Miss)"
 Ne-Yo – "Sexy Love"

Best R&B/Soul Single – Female
 Beyoncé – "Irreplaceable"
 Mary J. Blige – "Take Me As I Am"
 Keyshia Cole – "Love"
 LeToya – "Torn"

Best R&B/Soul Single – Group, Band or Duo
 Gnarls Barkley – "Crazy"
 The Isley Brothers Featuring Ronald Isley – "Just Came Here to Chill"
 Jagged Edge – "Good Luck Charm"
 The Pussycat Dolls  – "Stickwitu"

The Michael Jackson Award for Best R&B/Soul or Rap Music Video
 Jay Z – "Show Me What You Got"
 Beyoncé – "Irreplaceable"
 Busta Rhymes  – "I Love My Chick"
 Jim Jones – "We Fly High"

The Coca-Cola Classic Award for Best R&B/Soul or Rap New Artist
 Ne-Yo
 Lupe Fiasco
 Rick Ross
 Yung Joc

The Sprite Award for Best R&B/Soul or Rap Dance Cut
 DJ Webstar and Young B.  – "Chicken Noodle Soup"
 Dem Franchize Boyz  – "Lean wit It, Rock wit It"
 Sean Paul – "Give It Up to Me"
 Yung Joc – "It's Goin' Down"

Best Gospel Album
 Kirk Franklin – Songs from the Storm, Volume I
 The Caravans – Paved the Way
 Bishop G.E. Patterson & Congregation – Singing the Old Time Way, Volume II
 Youth for Christ – The Struggle is Over

Performers
 Jennifer Hudson
 Omarion
 Robin Thicke
 Letoya Luckett
 Rick Ross
 Ronald Isley
 DJ Webstar and Young B.

References

Soul Train Music Awards, 2007
Soul Train Music Awards
Soul
Soul
Soul